The Tancrède was a Lynx class aviso of the French Navy.

Career 
Designed by engineer Vésigné, Tancrède was appointed to the Far East division, where she took part in the Shimonoseki Campaign.

Notes, citations, and references
Notes

Citations

References

Ships built in France
1861 ships